Douglas Luke (10 January 1929, Staines, Middlesex – 3 January 2015) was an English photographer, known for his work with Gerry Anderson and the Beatles. In common with other members of the A.P. Films staff, David Lane had his passport picture taken by Luke.

References

1929 births
2015 deaths
Photographers from Surrey
People from Staines-upon-Thames